Mizoram is a state in the northeast of India.  Mizoram is considered by many as a beautiful place due to its dramatic landscape and pleasant climate. There have been many attempts to increase revenue through tourism but many potential tourists find the lack of amenities to be a hurdle. However, the State continues to promote itself and many projects have been initiated. The tourism ministry continues to maintain or upgrade its tourist lodges throughout the state. Foreign tourists are required to obtain an 'inner line permit' under the special permit before visiting. The permit can be obtained from Indian missions abroad for a limited number of days or direct from Mizoram Government authorities within India. The state is rich in bird diversity, which has the potentiality to make it a major birding destination. For Mrs Hume's pheasant (Syrmaticus humiae), Mizoram is a stronghold. There is also a rare record of the wild water buffalo from the state. There are several past records of the Sumatran rhinoceros from Mizoram, then Lushai Hills. The small population of wild elephants can be seen in Ngengpui and Dampa Sanctuaries. Some of the interesting sites are Mizo Poets' Square also known as Mizo Hlakungpui Mual in Mizo, the Great Megaliths locally known as 'Kawtchhuah Ropui'.

Major Towns and Cities of Mizoram

Aizawl
Aizawl is the capital of the state of Mizoram in India. It is also the centre of all important government offices, state assembly house and civil secretariat. The main tourist attraction in Aizawl are:
Bara Bazar is the main shopping centre of Aizawl in Dawrpui Veng locality. The steep Zion Street is lined with stalls selling garments. The main bazar is where the people are best seen in their traditional costumes selling produce from the farms as well as imports from China brought through Myanmar border area. The Millennium Center in the same locality is a popular shopping Mall.
Mizoram State Museum is located in the centre of the town at Zarkawt. This museum gives a good insight into Mizo traditions, culture and history.
Reiek Tourist Resort is a beautiful place at an elevation of 1548 metres, located 45 km south of Aizawl with a traditional Mizo Village.is a tourist spot 12 km from Aizawl, Mizoram.
Durtlang Hills situated on the northern side of Aizawl offers a fine view of the hill station from either Durtlang Hospital or Aizawl Theological College.
Hmuifang  is about 50 km from Aizawl with an elevation of 1619 metres, the mountain is still covered with virgin forests reserved since the Mizo Chief's time
 Berawtlang Tourist Complex situated 7 km from Aizawl is a recreational centre that hosts cultural activities. It is also considered a popular picnic spot.
Baktawng Village 70 km from Aizawl is the place where Pu Ziona lives with the "worlds largest existing family" with 39 wives, 94 children, 14 daughters-in-law and 33 grandchildren India.
Solomon's Temple, Aizawl Mizoram, India located in Kidron Valley, Chawlhhmun locality is a grand temple complex operated by Kohran Thianghlim of Mizoram.
Lalruanga Lung is located in N. Khawbung Village (Champhai district), N. Khawbung is not far from Champhai town, around 16 km from Champhai. Champhai is 194 km from Aizawl. Lalruanga history is one of the interesting, excellent and famous in MIZO folktales. On this rock (Lalruanga Lung), legendary Lalruanga's met his fateful end. ("Lalruanga" is a personal name, and "Lung" means stone or rock)

Champhai

Champhai is a border town in Mizoram state. Set on an altitude of 1678 metres, the town overlooks a patch of flat land which happens to be the largest plain area in the state and also commands a good view of the adjoining hill ranges of Myanmar from which the forefathers of the Mizos immigrated ages ago. Some of the more popular tourist spots near Champhai are:
Murlen National Park is home to a rich variety of flora and fauna. About 15 species of mammals, 150 species of birds, 35 species of Medicinal plants. 2 species of bamboos & 4 species of orchids so far have been recorded in this park.
 Mura Puk is situated in Zote village, which is 10 km away from Champhai town. There are six caves at this site and these were the hiding place of the local villagers.
 Rih dïl 27 kilometres from Champhai near Zokhawthar in Myanmar is considered to be the passage of the souls to the eternal abode. The lake is around a kilometre long and 70 metres wide.
 Zokhawthar is a trading town 28 km from Champhai on the border with Myanmar.
 Hnahlan is a grape growing area which is very close to Champhai with vineyards and beautiful climate.
Chawngtlai - A historical village (162 km from Aizawl, 50 km from Champhai). Chawngtlai  'Mizo-Historical village is situated in the eastern part of Mizoram which have many Historical monuments and assets such as Sahlam - a tree of hanging enemy's head during the period of War between Mizo and Halkha Pawih, Khawpuitan tlang, Lungphun sang-Tallest monoliths of Mizoram, Lungsen - future portrayal stone, Lung Milem - stone erected by Hmar

KhawbungKhawbung is a sub-town and the administrative headquarters of Khawbung RD Block in Champhai District. The village has an interesting tourist site  which is also known as Mizo Hlakungpui Mual. There is much historical and natural heritage in its neighboring villages which are included in Hlakungpui Package Tourism. 
 Mizo Hlakungpui Mual- is a monument to commemorate Mizo poets. It was set up in 1986. It is located at the southern edge of Khawbung Village.
 Kawtchhuah Ropui is a cluster of megaliths found near Vangchhia Village. Nearly 200 stones were erected. Those stones were dressed with embossed figures. It was declared as National Importance of Heritage in India.
 Dungtlang is the old site of ancient settlements wherein Archaeological remains have been found. Dolmen, animal, tools and implements and human figures were curved on some erected stones. Cubical stone-walls, stone mortar and different kinds of dressed stones have also been found.
 Lianchhiari Tlangabout 56 km from Champhai is a rocky ledge over a high cliff near the village of Dungtlang.
 Lianchhiari Tui Thuhruk is a fresh water running out from stratified rock in the southern part of Vanzau village land.
 Lungdawhkan is a large flat rock raised up like a table dolmen located at Mubu within the jurisdiction of Khawbung Village.
 Tlaikuang is the old site of Kairuma, Sailo Chief's village with 600 household. It is an important place that the British Expedition operated in the Lushai Hills was lasted in this place. Stones bearing embossed figures have been found in Tlaikuang.
 Chuaibengi Lung is a stone erected near Khawbung Village bearing the curving of human figures.
 Puanvawrh Puk is a natural cave at the toe of Puanvawrh Cliff. It is an ideal place for adventure sports. 
 Thasiama Seno Neihna is a flat on a rugged hillock measuring around 7.20 sqm near Vaphai village, which is 86 km away from Champhai.
 Fiara Tui is located about 65 km from Champhai and has its source in the Tan Tlang Mountain.
 Lamsial Puk was explored by Pu V Zakunga and his friends in 1972 located in the northern edge of Farkawn Village land. Many human bones have been found. Some historians opined that the collection of bones through Kuang-ur (traditional method of preserving bones of their relatives).
 Tan Tlang is a legendary peak which entails interesting Mizo folk tales and songs which is located in the junction area of three villages namely - Vaphai, Chawngtui and Farkawn. It is 6356 ft above sea level located near Vaphai village.
 Kungawrhi Hnuhluhna is a hole in the ground which bears a lengthy and sweet story of Kungawrhi, one of the popular Mizo folktales.
 Far Puk is a rock shelter interlinked with the Mizo history.
 Lungkeiphaw Tial is a large flat rock stretching on a hill slope on which different kinds of figures were curved.
 Chhura Chirawt Lung is a cylindrical stone having a cap-like top and four holes were bored on its side.
 Chawngvungi Lungdawh is a natural large rock on which embossed figures of buffalo's heads and humans were curved.
 Far Tlangpui Lungphun is a cluster of megaliths which numbered 52 stones and 10 broken stones.
 Lungpher Puk is a cave containing many human bones. It is near Thinghrangkawn within the land of Sazep village.
 Lungsen Puk is situated in the north eastern part of Leisenzo Village land which was once used as a storehouse of human bones.

Thenzawl

Thenzawl is a beautiful town located in the middle of Mizoram, the main tourist attractions are:
Thenzawl Golf Course  extends over 105 acres with play area of 75 acres and comprises 18 holes. Benkhuaia Thlan  - The founder of Thenzawl Bengkhuaia invaded Alexandrapur in 1871 kidnapping Mary Winchester which brought about the British to Mizoram. He died ub 1879.
  Vaibiak  is the place from where they took back Mary Winchester.
  Tualvungi Thlan  There are two graves at Phulpui village in the Aizawl district of Mizoram India. It is said that, Zawlpala, Chief of Phulpui village, married the legendary beauty, Talvungi of Thenzawl. Talvungi was subsequently married to the chief of Rothai, Punthia. But, Talvungi could not forget Zawlpala, her previous husband. After many years when Zawlpala died, grief-stricken Talvungi came to Phulpui, dug a pit by the side of Zawlpala's grave and asked an old woman to kill her and bury her in the grave.  Chawngchilhi Puk or cave had a love story between a lady and a snake.
 Tuirihiau falls is a beautiful waterfall near Thenzawl, upstream of Vantawng fall.
  Thenzawl Deer Park has 17 deers(11 female and 6 male) in natural environment.

Lunglei

Lunglei is a serene town and a major urban hub, situated in the south-central part of Mizoram. Lunglei district borders Bangladesh on the west via Tlabung sub-division which is an up-and-coming trading center. The name Lunglei means 'stone- lung' and 'bridge- lei' or Stonebridge named after a natural bridge made of stones a few kilometers from the town's area which used to attract curious visitors. The Main Tourist Attractions in Lunglei are:
 Zobawk Sports Academy Kawmzawl Park Khawnglung Wildlife Sanctuary Saikuti Hall where most of the concerts and celebrations are held. A unique museum has also been established in the hall where local painters demonstrate their skill and exhibit their works.
 Thuamluaia Mual' is the second football stadium with Artificial turf in Mizoram.

Hill stations

Hmuifang Tlang
Hmuifang is a tourist spot near Aizawl, Mizoram. It is about 50 km from Aizawl. With an elevation of 1619 metres, the mountain is still covered with virgin forests reserved since the Mizo Chief's time. Hmuifang is on the way to Lunglei.

Reiek Tlang
Reiek is a tourist 12 km from Aizawl. It rests at an elevation of 1548 metres, overlooking Aizawl and offers a view of the surrounding valleys and hills, on a clear day the plains of Bangladesh can be seen from the top of the hill. Reiek Hill is surrounded by thick lush green temperate trees and bushes.

Vanzau
Vanzau is a tourist spot located in the mountain range of Chalfilh Tlang (1865m), near Buhban village, Mizoram. It is about 100 km from Aizawl. With an elevation of 1721 metres above sea level, Vanzau is the most visited places and popular especially among the people living in its surrounding villages. Vanzau provides a good view of Mawmrang kham and its mountain ranges, and among the nearby villages, North Lungpher, Phullen, Thanglailung, Phuaibung, Buhban, Khawruhlian, Khanpui and Khawlian can be seen from this spot.

Lakes

Palak Dil
Palak dïl (lit. Palak Lake) or Pala Tipo (in Mara language) is the biggest lake in Mizoram.

Tam Dil
Tam Dil Lake is a reservoir located in the hills 6 km from Saitual, a nearby town and 110 km from Aizawl.

Waterfalls

It is a two-tiered waterfall with a total height of 99.6 metres. 
Tuirihiau falls uniqueness is that it can be seen from behind as it caves in behind the fall like an arc.

Festivals
Young Mizos are leaving traditional customs and adopting new ways of life which are greatly influenced by Western culture. Christmas is probably the biggest festival and local communities contribute towards large feasts, typically organised by nearby churches, where many hundreds in a local community would eat together. Traditional Mizo social gatherings revolve around the agricultural calendar.

Mim Kut
The Mim Kut is usually celebrated during the months of August and September, after the harvest of maize. Mim Kut is celebrated with great fanfare by (legally) drinking rice-beer, singing, dancing, and feasting. Samples of the year's harvests are consecrated to the departed souls of the community.

Chapchar Kut
Chapchar Kut is another festival celebrated during March after completion of their most arduous task of Jhum operation i.e., jungle-clearing (clearing of the remnants of burning). This is a spring festival celebrated with great fervour and gaiety.

Pawl Kut
Pawl Kut; Pawl'' means "straw" hence pawl kut means a straw harvest festival. It is typically celebrated in December and is another important festival.

Wildlife

Phawngpui
Phawngpui is the highest mountain peak in Mizoram, rising about 2157 metres high near the Myanmar border in Chhimtuipui District. Phawngpui Peak is famous for orchids and rhododendrons.

Dampa Tiger Reserve
Dampa Tiger Reserveis the largest wildlife sanctuary in Mizoram, was notified in 1985 and declared a tiger reserve in 1994. It is situated in the western part of Mizoram state, on the international border with Bangladesh about 127 km from Aizawl. It covers an area of approximately 550 km2. The tropical Forests of Dampa are home to rich flora and fauna. It consists of forest interpolated with steep precipitous hills, deep valleys, jungle streams, ripping rivulets, natural salts licks, with an altitudinal zone of 200 m to 800 m. Dampa Tiger Reserve is a part of Project Tiger funded by the Government of India.

Murlen National Park
Murlen National Park is a national park located in the Champhai district Mizoram in India.
The size of the park area is 200 km2. The park is situated about 245 km east of Aizawl, and is close to the Chin Hills. It covers an area of approximately 100 km2. The Tropical, Semi evergreen and Sub montane Forests of Murlen are home to a rich variety of flora and fauna. About 15 species of mammals, 150 species of birds, 35 species of Medicinal plants. 2 species of bamboos & 4 species of orchids so far have been recorded in this Park.At present, 36 people are involved in conservation work of Murlen National Park.

See also

 Tourism in North East India
 Tourism in Assam

References

External links

Mizoram Tourism Official Website
Mizo Hlakungpui Mual
The Official Website of Khawbung RD Block

 
Tourism in Northeast India